The men's individual road race at the 1952 Summer Olympics was held on 2 August, the 2nd last day of the Olympics on an 11,2 km course running counter-clockwise from Käpylä through Pakila and Maunula and back to Käpylä. The course was circled seventeen times, so the total length of the competition was 190,4 km. About half of the road was hard-surfaced, the other half sand-surfaced. There were 154 entries from 31 nations and 111 participants from 30 nations. Each nation could enter up to four cyclists; nations entering at least three cyclists had the scores of their best three finishers summed for the team road race event. The individual event was won by André Noyelle of Belgium, the nation's first victory in the men's individual road race. His teammate Robert Grondelaers took silver. Edi Ziegler earned Germany's first medal in the event since 1896 with his bronze.

Background

This was the fourth appearance of the event, previously held in 1896 and then at every Summer Olympics since 1936. It replaced the individual time trial event that had been held from 1912 to 1932 (and which would be reintroduced alongside the road race in 1996). France had won the last two Olympic road races. Gianni Ghidini of Italy was the 1951 world champion.

Japan, Romania, the Soviet Union, and Vietnam each made their debut in the men's individual road race. Great Britain made its fourth appearance in the event, the only nation to have competed in each appearance to date.

Competition format and course

The mass-start race was on a course that covered 17 laps of an 11.2 kilometres circuit on Koskelantie Street in Käpylä, for a total of 190.4 kilometres. The course was "not overly difficult in terms of climbs, but had few flat sections, consisting of rolling hills throughout." Lapped cyclists were eliminated and could not finish.

Schedule

All times are Eastern European Summer Time (UTC+3)

Results

Mårtensson made an early attack, taking a 45-second lead during lap 6, but was caught by the peloton in lap 8. By halfway, there was a clear lead group of nine cyclists. The Belgian riders Noyelle, Grondelaers, and Victor broke away during lap 11, with Ziegler and Maenan joining them. Maenan fell away from the front pack at lap 14. Noyelle made his break at the start of lap 17, taking an easy lead to win the race. Grondelaers separated from the other two remaining leaders with five kilometres to go, taking silver. The bronze came down to a sprint between Ziegler and Victor, with the German winning to prevent a Belgian medal sweep.

Behind the lead pack, a bad crash in lap 9 resulted in about 20 cyclists falling, with many unable to continue due to damage to their bicycles. The remaining second group of 11 cyclists continued until lap 15, when Bruni separated into clear fifth place and the other 10 cyclists finished close together.

References

Notes

Cycling at the Summer Olympics – Men's road race
Road cycling at the 1952 Summer Olympics